Events in the year 1912 in Ecuador.

Incumbents
President: Carlos Freile Zaldumbide until March 6, Francisco Andrade Marín until August 10, Alfredo Baquerizo until September 1, Leónidas Plaza

Events
January 4 - former President Eloy Alfaro returned to Ecuador and attempted another coup but was defeated, arrested and jailed by General and former President Leonidas Plaza.
January 28 - a group of pro-Catholic soldiers supported by a mob, broke into the prison where Alfaro and his colleagues were detained and dragged them along the cobbled streets of the city center. This sparks the Concha Revolution.
Ecuadorian presidential election, 1912

Births

Deaths
January 28 - Eloy Alfaro, former President

References